Luisa Mattioli (23 March 1936 – October 2021) was an Italian actress. She was active in cinema and television during the 1950s and 1960s, and was notably the third wife of Roger Moore.

Biography 
Mattioli met Roger Moore in 1961 while filming Romulus and the Sabines. However, Moore was married to Dorothy Squires at the time, and the couple was not able to get married until 11 April 1969. The couple had three children: Deborah, Geoffrey and Christian. The two separated in 1993 and divorced in 2000.

Mattioli died in Zürich, Switzerland in October 2021, at the age of 85.

Filmography

Film 
 (1956)
 (1956)
The Angel of the Alps (1957)
Mia nonna poliziotto (1958)
 (1958)
 (1958)
Some Like It Cold (1960)
Romulus and the Sabines (1961)
Oh Islam (1961)
The Corsican Brothers (1961)
Eighteen in the Sun (1962)
 (1962)
Storm Over Ceylon (1963)
 (1963)

Television 
 (1961)

References 

1936 births
2021 deaths
Actors from the Metropolitan City of Venice
Italian actresses